Zabeh (also Romanized as Ẕabeh; also known as Aḩmad Ebn el Ḩasan, Za‘abā-ye Majīd, Za‘bāy, and Za‘bāy-ye Majīd) is a village in Hoseynabad Rural District, in the Central District of Shush County, Khuzestan Province, Iran. At the 2006 census, its population was 1,006, in 176 families.

References 

Populated places in Shush County